Raymond Gerald Cyr (born December 26, 1933) is a Canadian former professional hockey player who played for the Rochester Americans and Providence Reds in the American Hockey League. He also played for the Port Huron Flags in the International Hockey League, and 697 games in the Western Hockey League for the San Francisco Seals and Vancouver Canucks.

External links
 

1933 births
Living people
People from Campbellton, New Brunswick
Ice hockey people from New Brunswick
Rochester Americans players
Providence Reds players
Port Huron Flags (IHL) players
San Francisco Seals (ice hockey) players
Vancouver Canucks (WHL) players
Canadian ice hockey centres